The Würtemberg I was a class of tender locomotives of the Royal Württemberg State Railways (Königlich Württembergischen Staats-Eisenbahnen, K.W.St.E). They were their first locomotives.

Development 
The three locomotives were of the 4-4-0 wheel arrangement and were manufactured by the Norris Locomotive Works in Philadelphia. They had a round-topped firebox, which sat between the two pairs of driving wheels. The two outside cylinders were mounted at front of the boiler, at the height of the front axle.

The open cab was level with the outer edge of the frame and was therefore rather narrow. The wheel arch for the rear driving wheels also protruded into the cab. The locomotives were rebuilt during their service lives and were withdrawn in 1861.

Fleet list

References 
 

4-4-0 locomotives
1
Norris locomotives
Railway locomotives introduced in 1845
Standard gauge locomotives of Germany
2′B n2 locomotives